Lemhi County Airport  is a public airport located four miles (6 km) south of the central business district (CBD) of Salmon, a city in Lemhi County, Idaho, USA.

Airlines and destinations

References 

Airports in Idaho
Buildings and structures in Lemhi County, Idaho
Transportation in Lemhi County, Idaho